Bugs Bunny: Superstar is a 1975 Looney Tunes documentary film narrated by Orson Welles and produced and directed by Larry Jackson. It was the first documentary to examine the history of Warner Bros. Looney Tunes with its cartoon characters.

Synopsis
The film includes nine Looney Tunes/Merrie Melodies cartoons (six featuring Bugs Bunny) which were previously released during the 1940s:

 What's Cookin' Doc? (1944), directed by Bob Clampett
 The Wild Hare (a.k.a. A Wild Hare) (1940), directed by Tex Avery
 A Corny Concerto (1943), directed by Clampett
 I Taw a Putty Tat (1948), directed by Friz Freleng
 Rhapsody Rabbit (1946), directed by  Freleng
 Walky Talky Hawky (1946), directed by Robert McKimson
 My Favorite Duck (1942), directed by Chuck Jones
 Hair-Raising Hare (1946), directed by Jones
 The Old Grey Hare (1944), directed by Clampett

Interviews
Bugs Bunny: Superstar includes interviews with some legendary Warner Bros. animation directors of that time period: Friz Freleng, Tex Avery and most prominently Bob Clampett. Clampett, whose collection of drawings, films, and memorabilia from the golden days of Termite Terrace was legendary, provided nearly all of the behind-the-scenes drawings and home-movie footage for the film; furthermore, his wife, Sody Clampett, is credited as the film's production co-ordinator. Robert McKimson, Mel Blanc, and Chuck Jones were intended to be interviewed for the film, but all three were ultimately not involved for various reasons. Freleng and Avery appear only fleetingly in the film; according to Jackson, Freleng was laconic and did not reveal much, and while Avery talked at length and was entertaining, relatively little of what he said could be used for the film.

Approximately 30 minutes of the film's 90-minute duration is made up of Warner Bros documentary footage.

Production 

The nine full-length cartoons featured in Bugs Bunny: Superstar were originally released between July 1940 and April 1948. In 1956, Associated Artists Productions ("a.a.p.") acquired the distribution rights to Warners' pre-August 1948 color cartoons. United Artists acquired a.a.p. in 1958 and thereby gained the rights to the aforementioned Warners cartoons; this is why United Artists distributed Bugs Bunny: Superstar and why Warner's compilation films of the 1970s and 1980s did not feature any pre-1948 cartoons. (Warner eventually re-acquired the rights to its pre-August 1948 cartoons after the 1996 Time Warner-Turner merger). Larry Jackson sought, unsuccessfully, to feature post-1948 Warners cartoons in his film.

Jackson had cultivated a friendship with Orson Welles and originally intended the bridging material of Bugs Bunny: Superstar to be a parody of Welles' Citizen Kane (1941). Welles' reluctance towards that idea ensured that Jackson's film would be a straightforward documentary; however, Welles did agree to provide narration for the film. The audio quality of Welles' narration was muffled, which did not escape the notice of critics. Writing for The New York Times, Vincent Canby remarked that "Orson Welles bridges the gaps with facetious narration that sounds as if it had been left on someone's Phone-Mate." Larry Jackson later revealed he was unaware that Welles had recorded his lines in stereo. Only one track of Welles' recording – from the microphone that was furthest away – was used in the film's final mix, accounting for the relatively poor audio quality of the narration.

Upon its theatrical release, Bugs Bunny: Superstar was marketed with the tagline, "You won't believe how much you missed as a kid!" According to Larry Jackson, this was a reference to how audiences accustomed to watching Warner Bros. cartoons on television were unaware of the history behind those cartoons. Jackson commented that Bugs Bunny: Superstar outgrossed The Rocky Horror Picture Show during its original run. Jackson also recounts being personally complimented by Paul Simon, who was a fan of the film.

Controversy 
Contemporary critics pointed out that Bob Clampett's important role as one of the primary developers of the early Warner cartoons was noticeably slanted due to his prominent presence in Bugs Bunny: Superstar. In an audio commentary recorded for the 2012 DVD release, Larry Jackson claimed that in order to secure Clampett's participation and access to Clampett's collection of Warners Bros. history (memorabilia, drawings, films, photographs etc.), he had to sign a contract that stipulated Clampett would host the documentary, select the cartoons featured, and have approval over the final cut. Jackson further claimed that Clampett was very reluctant to speak about the other directors and their contributions. According to Jackson, Clampett was "insecure" about his place in the legacy of Warner Bros. cartoons. Furthermore, several of the cartoons featured in Bugs Bunny: Superstar are the "Blue Ribbon" versions which lack opening titles (including director credits). However, the three Clampett-directed cartoons are the original versions, preserving Clampett's director credit.

The documentary infuriated many of the Warner Bros. artists, as Clampett liberally took credit for several iconic Warner Bros. characters. Clampett implied that he was the creator of Bugs Bunny, claiming that he used Clark Gable's carrot-eating scene in It Happened One Night as inspiration for the character. Subsequently, Chuck Jones pointedly left out Clampett's name in the 1979 compilation film The Bugs Bunny/Road Runner Movie when Bugs discusses his "fathers" (i.e. Jones and other Warner's directors). Although Chuck Jones opted to not contribute to Bugs Bunny: Superstar, Jackson claimed he remained friends with Jones for many years.

The release of Bugs Bunny: Superstar, in fact, brought to a head resentments that had grown between Chuck Jones and Bob Clampett for years. In June 1969, animation historian Michael Barrier interviewed Clampett for an article that appeared in issue #12 of Funnyworld magazine (fall 1970). In the course of the interview, Clampett implied or outright claimed to be the creator of characters such as Bugs Bunny, Daffy Duck, Porky Pig, Sniffles, and Yosemite Sam. The publication of this interview, as well as the release of Bugs Bunny: Superstar, drew the ire of Chuck Jones, who responded by writing a letter (dated 11 December 1975) and enlisting Tex Avery to make annotations (dated 22 December 1975). Jones's letter, which was publicly circulated, refers to "the grossly unfair misrepresentations of BUGS BUNNY SUPER STAR," adding,

For his part, Barrier stated in a 1992 essay that both Jones and Clampett were enthusiastic self-promoters, adding that "more hazardous to the interviewer was their fundamentally innocent tendency to take for granted that they stood at the center of the Warner cartoon universe."

Release 
Bugs Bunny: Superstar was first released in theatres on December 19, 1975 to good reception.

Home media 
The film was released on laserdisc and VHS/Betamax format during the late 1980s by media company MGM/UA Home Video.

It was re-released on DVD on November 14, 2006, as a two-part special feature in the box set Looney Tunes Golden Collection: Volume 4. While most of the individual cartoons had been previously released as separate, refurbished entries in the Golden Collection, Bugs Bunny: Superstar was not restored, with some age wear apparent from the original film stock. All but two cartoons were replaced by versions created by Turner Entertainment Co. in 1995. The Old Grey Hare used an original a.a.p. print (evidenced by the a.a.p. opening soundtrack) to preserve the ending gag involving the "That's all, Folks" title card, which was lost in the Turner updated version. I Taw a Putty Tat was also restored to the a.a.p. print, as the Turner version contained an edit to remove a blackface gag. Aside from leaving in the edited scene, however, the print on the set is basically the same as the Turner version.

On November 15, 2012, Warner Home Video released the documentary on DVD as part of the Warner Archive Collection. This version includes audio commentary by Larry Jackson. Reviewing the Bugs Bunny: Superstar DVD in 2012, animation writer Thad Komorowski wrote,

See also 
 List of American films of 1975
 Golden Age of American animation
 Compilation film

References

External links 
 
 
 

1975 documentary films
1975 films
American documentary films
1975 controversies
American films with live action and animation
Looney Tunes films
Film controversies
Bugs Bunny films
Daffy Duck films
Porky Pig films
Animated anthology films
United Artists films
Warner Bros. films
1970s American animated films
Documentary films about animation
1970s English-language films